Acuriá River (sometimes spelt Acariá River) is a river of Acre state in western Brazil. It is one of the main affluents of the Juruá River.

See also
List of rivers of Acre

References

Rivers of Acre (state)